Patience is the state of endurance under difficult circumstances.

Patience may also refer to:

Places
 Patience Island (Rhode Island)
 Gulf of Patience, a gulf off the coast of eastern Russia

People
 Patience (given name), a female given name;  includes a list of people with the name
Judy Patience (born 1939), New Zealand artist specialising in weaving

Art, entertainment, and media

 Patience (game), a family of single-player card games also known as Solitaire
 Patience, the name for one of the most popular card games, also called Klondike (US) or Canfield (UK)
 Patience sorting, a sorting algorithm based on the card game
 "Patience" (poem), written in the late 14th century
 "Patience" (The X-Files), an episode of the television series The X-Files
 Patience Phillips, who becomes Catwoman in the film Catwoman
 Patience (graphic novel), a science-fiction love story by Daniel Clowes
Patience and Fortitude, the lion sculptures flanking the entrance to the Schwarzman branch of the New York Public Library
 Patience (play), a 1998 play by Jason Sherman

Music
 Frank Iero and the Patience
 Patience (Peter Hammill album), 1983
 Patience (Over the Rhine album), 1992
 Patience (George Michael album), 2004
 Patience (The Dead C album), 2010
 Patience (Mannequin Pussy album), 2019
 Patience (opera), or "Bunthorne's Bride", a Gilbert & Sullivan comic opera

Songs
 "Patience" (Guns N' Roses song), a 1988 song by Guns N' Roses
 "Patience" (KSI song), a 2021 song by KSI featuring Yungblud and Polo G
 "Patience" (Take That song), a 2006 song by Take That
 "Patience" (Tame Impala song), a 2019 song by Tame Impala
 "Patience" (Dreamgirls song), a song from the 2006 film Dreamgirls
 "Patience", a 2005 song by Dala from This Moment Is a Flash
 "Patience", a 2010 song by Nas and Damian Marley from Distant Relatives

Other uses
Kshanti, Buddhist concept of patience as a practice of perfection

See also
 
 
 Patient (disambiguation)